The Palas Power Station is a large thermal power plant located in Constanța, Constanța County, Romania, having 2 generation groups of 50 MW each having a total electricity generation capacity of 100 MW.

External links
Official site 

Natural gas-fired power stations in Romania